Karlodinium antarcticum is a species of unarmored dinoflagellates from the genus Karlodinium. It was first isolated from the Australian region of the Southern Ocean, near the polar front. It is medium-sized and is characterized by its long ovoid cell shape and rather long apical groove. It is considered potentially ichthyotoxic.

References

Further reading

External links

WORMS

Species described in 2008
Gymnodiniales